William Sanderson (1885–1911) was an English footballer who played in the Football League for Preston North End.

References

1885 births
1911 deaths
English footballers
Association football forwards
English Football League players
Barrow A.F.C. players
Preston North End F.C. players